Pickel may refer to:

People 
 Allan Pickel (1878–1955), Canadian politician
 Bill Pickel (born 1959), American football player
 Charles Pickel (born 1997), Swiss footballer
 Clemens Pickel (born 1962), Russian Catholic bishop 
 Follin Horace Pickel (1866–1949), Canadian politician
 Heinrich Pickel (1883–1964), German politician
 John Pickel, Canadian lawyer and politician
 Marc Aurel Pickel (born 1971), German yacht racer

Places 
 Pickel, Missouri

See also 
 Pickle (disambiguation)
 Pickles (disambiguation)